Abov Avetisyan (born 3 October 2001) is a professional footballer who plays for Slovak 2. liga club FK Humenné. Born in Ukraine, he represented Armenia internationally.

Career
Avetisyan is a product of FC Shakhtar Donetsk Youth Sportive School System, but in 2014 he was transferred from his native Donetsk to Zakarpattia Oblast, because of the Russo-Ukrainian War. He continued his youth career in Hungary.

Career statistics
.

References

External links
 
 

2001 births
Living people
Footballers from Donetsk
Ukrainian people of Armenian descent
Ukrainian footballers
Armenian footballers
Armenia under-21 international footballers
Association football defenders
Kisvárda FC players
FK Humenné players
Nemzeti Bajnokság I players
Ukrainian expatriate footballers
Armenian expatriate footballers
Expatriate footballers in Hungary
Armenian expatriate sportspeople in Hungary
Ukrainian expatriate sportspeople in Hungary
Expatriate footballers in Slovakia
Armenian expatriate sportspeople in Slovakia
Ukrainian expatriate sportspeople in Slovakia